Doto oblicua is a species of sea slug, a nudibranch, a marine gastropod mollusc in the family Dotidae''.

Distribution
This species was first described from Galicia, Spain.

Description

Ecology

References

External links

Dotidae
Gastropods described in 1978